CCCS may refer to:
Centre for Contemporary Cultural Studies, a research centre at the University of Birmingham, England
Christ Church Cathedral School
Christian Congregational Church of Samoa
Command, control and coordination system, in military jargon
Consumer Credit Counselling Service, a registered charity in the United Kingdom
California Community Colleges System
Colorado Community College System
Tricarbon monosulfide when represented as its chemical structure